St Johns Park High School (abbreviated as SJPHS) is a government-funded co-educational comprehensive secondary day school, located on Mimosa Road in , a south-western suburb of Sydney, New South Wales, Australia.

Established in 1978, the school caters to approximately 900 students from Year 7 to Year 12, many of whom come from a language background other than English. The school is operated by the New South Wales Department of Education.

Overview 
In 2005, the senior students' HSC results were impressive, when 26 students achieved a score of either ninety or above out of one hundred in over forty-four subjects. Subsequently, St Johns Park High School came second on the list of top HSC scoring schools in the area of Fairfield City, behind Sefton High School.

St Johns Park High School, among its fellow high schools, is known for its strict uniform. Michael Juchau, St Johns Park High School's principal for ten years (1997–2007), was adamant in taking pride in the St Johns' uniform, Susan French, St Johns Park's second principal did not disappoint and even the newest principal Effie Niarchos, being one of the leaders of the Canberra uniform movement.

In early 2008 the school announced that a new motto: Safe Respectful Learners would also be used alongside the original motto, Know First Yourself. Banners with the new motto present on them can be seen around school grounds. However many students dislike the new motto and feel that the original motto is more honourable.

Achievements
St Johns Park High School has dominated in the sport of table tennis in the NSW State for fifteen years led by their coach D Ho. Not only have they gained success in the state level but also at the National level, taking out the Australian Schools Open Boys title and also the Australia Schools Intermediate Girls title. This was a tremendous achievement and table tennis is highly regarded by the students at the school.

Curriculum 

The school faculties include: agriculture, art, English, history, design and technology, industrial arts, language, mathematics, PDHPE, science, music, social science, and special education.

Notable alumni
 Chris Bowenpolitician; served as the Member for McMahon since 2010, having previously served as the Member for Prospect from 2004 to 2010
 Harry Kewellformer soccer player; now soccer coach; played with the Socceroos and Melbourne Victory, as well as internationally

See also 

 List of government schools in New South Wales
 Education in Australia

References

External links
 

South Western Sydney
Public high schools in Sydney
Educational institutions established in 1978
1978 establishments in Australia